The Americas Zone was one of the three regional zones of the 1968 Davis Cup.

9 teams entered the Americas Zone: 4 teams competed in the North & Central America Zone, while 5 teams competed in the South America Zone. The winner of each sub-zone would play against each other to determine who moved to the Inter-Zonal Zone to compete against the winners of the Eastern Zone and Europe Zone.

The United States defeated Mexico in the North & Central America Zone final, and Ecuador defeated Chile in the South America Zone final. In the Americas Inter-Zonal Final, the United States defeated Ecuador and progressed to the Inter-Zonal Zone.

North & Central America Zone

Draw

Semifinals

United States vs. Caribbean/West Indies

Mexico vs. Canada

Final

United States vs. Mexico

South America Zone

Draw

Quarterfinals

Venezuela vs. Argentina

Semifinals

Venezuela vs. Ecuador

Peru vs. Chile

Final

Ecuador vs. Chile

Americas Inter-Zonal Final

United States vs. Ecuador

References

External links
Davis Cup official website

Davis Cup Americas Zone
America Zone
Davis Cup